Bisée (sometimes spelled Bisee) is a town in Castries District, Saint Lucia.  With a population of 12,980, it is the second largest town in Saint Lucia.

The Saint Lucia Bureau of Standards is located in Bisée.

See also
List of cities in Saint Lucia

References

Towns in Saint Lucia